The Voere VEC-91 is a rifle made by Voere and was the first commercial sporting rifle to combine caseless ammunition and electronic firing. Depending upon its chambering, it fired a 5.56 (0.223"), 5.7 mm or 6 mm projectile at muzzle velocities of up to 930 metres per second (3,051 feet per second). The rifle was first exported to the United States in 1993, but was not a commercial success.

Design
Caseless ammunition has been a popular military rifle concept since the end of World War II, but has never met with public approval due to its sole source nature (and it cannot be handloaded at home). The main benefits of caseless ammunition to the military are that ammunition can be made lighter, enabling soldiers to carry several hundred rounds, and the fact that case extraction is not required allows a faster automatic rate of fire, both of which are immaterial to the needs of the typical civilian shooter or hunter, who rarely wants to carry hundreds of rounds of ammunition, or is allowed to own an automatic firearm. Voere attempted to introduce caseless ammunition to civilian shooters in 1991 with the VEC-91.

When chambered for 5.7 mm the rifle used a 5-round magazine, and it used a 4-round magazine when chambered in 6 mm. Two 15-volt dry cell batteries, located in the pistol grip, allowed it to fire approximately 5,000 rounds before the batteries needed to be replaced.

The bolt contained no firing pin or striker, just a ceramic cap that would electronically detonate the primer via the battery charge. The cartridge was designed by Hubert Usel and is known as the Usel Caseless Cartridge (UCC). The round was encased in a block of solid nitrocellulose and because it was not an automatic rifle it did not have the problems with cooking-off that plagued earlier military attempts such as the Heckler & Koch G11, in which the built up heat of sustained fire caused rounds to detonate immediately upon entering the chamber, releasing more heat, and often resulting in an uncontrollable burst of automatic fire until the magazine was emptied (although this is a risk in normal metallic cartridge firearms as well).

The VEC-91 was capable of great accuracy due to several factors inherent to the design, and several factors due to its implementation. First, the trigger activated a button, requiring little pressure. Second, the electronic ignition meant that there was no latency due to lock time, the firing sequence was almost instantaneous. With respect to the implementation, the rifle came with a 20" match grade premium barrel. Lastly, all ammunition came from one source, with the result that all rounds were identical within manufacturing tolerances.

Voere built the rifle with a walnut stock in the Monte-Carlo design with a high cheek rest, schnabel forend, checkered grip and sling swivels intended for the hunting market. The trigger was adjustable from 0.5 oz to 5 lbs. The barrel was 20" in length and the rifle 39" overall.

The proprietary nature of the rifle's caseless ammunition and supply chain problems prevented it from being successful in the United States, but Voere still produces the rifle for the European market, as of 2007.

See also
 Daisy V/L

References

External links
 Basic info about the rifle (Archived with The Wayback Machine; Original page offline)

Bolt-action rifles
Rifles of Austria
Caseless firearms